The Sausage-Maker Who Disappeared is a 1941 Norwegian comedy film written and directed by Toralf Sandø, starring Leif Juster and Ernst Diesen. Private investigators Gløgg (Diesen) and Rask (Juster) have been hired to trace a butcher (or sausage-maker) who has disappeared. This leads the two into a number of adventures. The movie is today best known for Juster's performance of the song "Pølsemaker, pølsemaker".

Cast
Leif Juster as private detective Stein Rask
Ernst Diesen as Simon Gløgg, Rask's assistant 
Joachim Holst-Jensen as sausage-maker H. Brand
Eva Steen as Mrs. H. Brand
Eva Lunde as Solveig Brand
Jens Gundersen as actor Ivar Johansen
Kristian Hefte as butcher's friend Rudolf Jensen
Wenche Klouman as Malla Hansen
Leif Enger as engineer Barratt
Lisi Carén as dancer Flora
Kari Diesen as maid
Marie Therese Øgaard as Marie Therese
Jon Sund as lecturer
Jack Fjeldstad as waiter
Herman Hansen as man on tram
Harald Aimarsen as Brodersen
Inger Jacobsen as radio singer
Tryggve Larssen as Barrat'sassistant Bukki Matti

External links
 
 

1941 films
1941 comedy films
Films directed by Toralf Sandø
Norwegian comedy films
Norwegian black-and-white films
1940s Norwegian-language films